is a Japanese manga series written and illustrated by Mai Matsuda. It was serialized in Futabasha's seinen manga magazine Manga Action from May 2021 to August 2022, with its chapters collected in four tankōbon volumes.

Publication
Written and illustrated by Mai Matsuda, Hikaru in the Light! was serialized in Futabasha's seinen manga magazine Manga Action from May 1, 2021, to August 2, 2022. Futabasha collected its chapters in four tankōbon volumes, released from September 28, 2021, to September 28, 2022.

The manga has been licensed in English by KiraKira's digital manga service Azuki and started publishing the series on June 13, 2022.

Volume list

References

Further reading

External links
  
 
 

Futabasha manga
Japanese idols in anime and manga
Seinen manga